Packing may refer to:

Law and politics
 Jury packing, selecting biased jurors for a court case
 Packing and cracking, a method of creating voting districts to give a political party an advantage

Other uses
 Packing (firestopping), the process of installing backer materials, such as mineral wool in service penetrations 
 Packing (phallus), the practice of wearing a phallic object inside the clothing to give the appearance of male genitals
 Packing, in autism therapy, wrapping children in cold wet sheets
 Packing, also known as an O-ring or other type of mechanical seal, a term for a sealing material
 Packing problems, a family of optimization problems in mathematics

See also
 
 
 Pack (disambiguation)
 Packer (disambiguation)
 Unpacking (disambiguation)